Buchanan Airport  is an airport serving Buchanan, in the Grand Bassa County in Liberia.

Note: Several common airport lists  have incorrect coordinates for Buchanan GLBU. In addition, several attribute the IATA "UCN" identifier to Lamco Airport.

See also
Transport in Liberia

References

 Google Earth

Airports in Liberia